The Wildenstein & Company Building is an edifice that stands at 19 East 64th Street, near Madison Avenue on Manhattan, New York City's Upper East Side. It is five stories tall and was completed in early 1932. The building was designed in French 18th-century style by Philadelphia, Pennsylvania, architect Horace Trumbauer. Its facade is made of limestone. 

The Wildenstein art firm was located in the former Vanderbilt house at 647 Fifth Avenue, between 51st and 52nd Streets, for several years prior to the structure's completion. The Charles F. Noyes Company arranged a five-year extension of a $545,000 mortgage at 5% in June 1932.

In October 1993, Wildenstein & Company purchased 49% of the Pace Gallery. The deal combined a 118-year-old gallery which specialized in Old Master and Impressionist paintings with a 32-year-old gallery which was renowned for its contemporary art and modern art. The Wildenstein gallery remained at the Wildenstein Building. Pace's SoHo branch at 142 Greene Street also became part of the combined business. In April 2010, the combined gallery announced it was splitting, and Pace bought out Wildenstein's 49%.

In 1997 the house had up to 11 members of the Wildenstein family living in it at any one time, leading art dealer Harry Brooks to humorously call the house the "most expensive tenement in Manhattan".
The Government of Qatar planned to buy the house for $90 million in 2014 and operate it as a consulate. The Russian businessman Len Blavatnik sued David Wildenstein, believing that the Wildenstein family had reneged on a promise to sell Blavatnik the property for $79 million. A judge rejected the suit in court in March 2017 stating that the verbal agreement was not legally binding.

In April 2017 it became the most expensive townhouse ever sold in Manhattan when it sold for $79.5 million. The building sold again in February 2018, for $90 million. As of April 2019, it was the home of Skarstedt Gallery. Plans now are for LGDR Gallery to take over in 2023.

References

Buildings and structures completed in 1932
Residential buildings in Manhattan
Cultural history of New York City
Upper East Side